The 1876 East Retford by-election was fought on 24 February 1876.  The byelection was fought due to the death of the incumbent Conservative MP, George Monckton-Arundell.  It was won by the Conservative candidate William Beckett-Denison.

References

1876 elections in the United Kingdom
1876 in England
19th century in Nottinghamshire
Retford
By-elections to the Parliament of the United Kingdom in Nottinghamshire constituencies